Edwin Keith Thomson (February 8, 1919 – December 9, 1960), usually known as Keith Thomson, was a United States representative from Wyoming. A highly decorated World War II veteran, Thomson served three terms in Wyoming's only U.S. House seat. On November 8, 1960, he was elected to the U.S. Senate, but died a month later of a heart attack before taking office.

Early life
Born in Newcastle, Wyoming, he grew up on a ranch in Crook County and attended public schools in Beulah, Wyoming, and Spearfish, South Dakota. He graduated in 1941 from the University of Wyoming Law School in Laramie. While in law school he met his wife, Thyra Godfrey Thomson, and they were married in 1939.

Military service
Thomson was called to active duty on March 24, 1941 and commanded the Second Battalion, Three Hundred and Sixty-second Infantry Regiment, Ninety-first Division. He was released from active duty as a lieutenant colonel on January 24, 1946. He had been admitted to the bar in 1941 and commenced the practice of law in Cheyenne in February 1946; he was a delegate to the 1952 Republican National Convention in Chicago and was a member of the Wyoming House of Representatives from 1952 to 1954.

Political career

Thomson was elected as a member of the Republican Party to the Eighty-fourth, Eighty-fifth, and Eighty-sixth Congresses and served from January 3, 1955, until his death. Thomson voted in favor of the Civil Rights Acts of 1957 and 1960. He did not seek renomination to the Eighty-seventh Congress, but was elected to the United States Senate on November 8, 1960, for the term commencing January 3, 1961. However, he died of a heart attack in Cody, Wyoming in December, before his term in the Senate began. Democratic Governor John J. Hickey appointed himself to the seat but was defeated in a 1962 special election to serve out the term by Republican Milward L. Simpson. Thomson was interred at Arlington National Cemetery.

Following Thomson's death, his wife Thyra Thomson was elected in 1962 as Wyoming Secretary of State. She was re-elected to five more terms, and served in that office for twenty-four years, until 1987.

See also

 List of United States Congress members who died in office (1950–99)

References

External links

 The Edwin Keith Thomson papers at the American Heritage Center

|-

|-

1919 births
1960 deaths
20th-century American lawyers
20th-century American politicians
Burials at Arlington National Cemetery
Elected officials who died without taking their seats
Republican Party members of the Wyoming House of Representatives
People from Crook County, Wyoming
People from Lawrence County, South Dakota
People from Newcastle, Wyoming
Politicians from Cheyenne, Wyoming
Republican Party members of the United States House of Representatives from Wyoming
Republican Party United States senators from Wyoming
University of Wyoming College of Law alumni
Wyoming lawyers